Oliver Alke is a male former international table tennis player from Germany.

He won a bronze medal at the 1993 World Table Tennis Championships in the Swaythling Cup (men's team event) with Steffen Fetzner, Peter Franz, Richard Prause and Jörg Roßkopf for Germany.

See also
 List of table tennis players
 List of World Table Tennis Championships medalists

References

German male table tennis players
1970 births
Living people
World Table Tennis Championships medalists